Hypnotized (American English) or Hypnotised (Commonwealth English) is the state of being under hypnosis.

Hypnotized or Hypnotised may also refer to:

Songs
 "Hypnotised" (Coldplay song), 2017
 "Hypnotized" (Sophie Ellis-Bextor song), 2022
 "Hypnotized" (Fleetwood Mac song), 1973
 "Hypnotized" (Gemini song), 2007
 Hypnotized (Tory Lanez song)
 "Hypnotized" (Plies song), 2007
 "Hypnotized" (Purple Disco Machine and Sophie and the Giants song), 2021
 Hypnotized (Rihanna song)
 "Hypnotized" (Shanadoo song), 2007
 Hypnotised (Simple Minds song)
 "Hypnotized" (Spacemen 3 song), 1989
 "Hypnotized" (Mark Stewart song), 1985
 Hypnotised (Years & Years song)
 "Hypnotised", a song by 2 Unlimited
 "Hypnotised", a song by Aberfeldy
 "Hypnotised", a song by Cabaret Voltaire
 "Hypnotised", a song by Rüfüs
 "Hypnotised", a song by Split Enz
 "Hypnotized", a song by Blind Melon
 "Hypnotized", a song by The Drifters
 "Hypnotized", a song by Linda Jones

Films
 Hypnotized (1910 film), a 1910 American silent short drama
 Hypnotized (1932 film), a 1932 American comedy film
 Hypnosis (1920 film)
 Hypnosis (2020 film)

Other
 Hypnotised (album), a 1980 album by The Undertones

See also
 Hypnotize (disambiguation)